Rappottenstein is a municipality in the district of Zwettl in the Austrian state of Lower Austria.

Gallery

References

Cities and towns in Zwettl District